The Agriculture, Fisheries and Conservation Department (formerly the Agriculture and Fisheries Department before 2000, of the Hong Kong Government is responsible for agriculture and fisheries in Hong Kong, conservation projects and issues, and managing the country parks and special areas.

It currently reports to the Environment and Ecology Bureau, though previously it was under the Secretary for Food and Health from 2007 to 2022, Secretary for Health, Welfare and Food and Secretary for the Environment, Transport and Works, and before 2000, the Secretary for Economic Services. The department is also responsible for issuing special, transshipment and pet import permits for pet animals, plants to be transshipped through or imported into Hong Kong.

Director
The department is headed by the Director of Agriculture, Fisheries and Conservation (titled Director of Agriculture and Fisheries before 2000). The current director is Alan Wong Chi-kong.

List of directors
 Jack Cater (1964-1965)
 Edward Hewitt Nichols (1965-1980)
 John Morrison Riddell-Swan (1980-1983)
 Gavin J. Hoult
 Lessie Wei
 Alan Wong Chi-kong

History 
In January 2022, the AFCD banned the importation of hamsters after some were infected with COVID-19; in January 2023, the AFCD lifted the ban, but required that imported hamsters test negative for the virus.

See also
 Agriculture and aquaculture in Hong Kong
 Fish Marketing Organisation

References

Hong Kong government departments and agencies
Agriculture in Hong Kong
Fisheries in Hong Kong
Environment of Hong Kong
Country parks and special areas of Hong Kong
Hong Kong
Environmental agencies